Somanga Thermal Power Station is a , natural gas powered, electricity generating power station in Tanzania.

Location

Overview
Somanga Power Station is owned and operated by Tanesco, the Tanzanian electricity distribution monopoly. It was constructed between 2007 and 2010, with a loan from the World Bank. The power generated is evacuated by two separate 33kV power lines to Kilwa and Ikwiriri. Power is then distributed to the neighboring communities of  Kilwa Kivinje, Nangurukuru, Somanga, Muhoro, Ikwiriri, Kibiti and Bungu. As at September 2016, this power station was not connected  to the Tanzanian national electricity grid.

Operations
The power plant operates on natural gas sources from Songo Songo Island via pipeline. The plant has three Jenbacher engines, each with a generating capacity of 2.5MW, bringing installed capacity to 7.5MW.

Future plans
The government of Tanzania has plans to build a grid-connected gas-powered electricity power station at Somanga-Fungu village near or at the location of the present installation. The new power plant will have installed capacity of 200MW to 400MW. A financial adviser has been selected to advise government on the project.

See also
Tanzania Electric Supply Company Limited 
List of power stations in Tanzania
Economy of Tanzania

References

External links
Website of Tanesco

Power stations in Tanzania
Lindi Region
Energy infrastructure completed in 2010
2010 establishments in Tanzania